And the Anonymous Nobody... (stylized as and the Anonymous Nobody...) is the ninth and most recent full-length studio album by American hip hop group De La Soul, the group's first full-length album since The Grind Date and its last prior to group member Trugoy the Dove's death in 2023. It was released on August 26, 2016, on A.O.I. Records, executive produced by Jordan Katz. The group announced the track list on May 20, 2016.

The album has guest features from 2 Chainz, Damon Albarn, David Byrne, Estelle, Little Dragon, Snoop Dogg, Jill Scott, Justin Hawkins, Pete Rock, and Roc Marciano. It received positive reviews by critics, and peaked at 12 on the Billboard 200. The album was nominated for Best Rap Album at the 2017 Grammy Awards.

Background 
In early 2015, De La Soul created a Kickstarter in order to fund the album. In under ten hours, it surpassed the projected goal of $110,000. Initially, the group announced that the album would be released on April 29, 2016. Subsequently, releasing a new EP titled For Your Pain & Suffering on April 29, 2016, the group rescheduled the release of the album for August 26, 2016.
The first single, "Pain" (featuring Snoop Dogg), was released on June 1, 2016.

Critical reception

At Metacritic, which assigns a normalized rating out of 100 to reviews from mainstream critics, the album received an average score of 77, based on 28 reviews, which indicates "generally favorable reviews". Writing for Exclaim!, Kyle Mullin gave the album a rave review, calling it "one of the most thrilling, wide-ranging rap releases of the year."

Commercial performance
In the United States, And the Anonymous Nobody... debuted at number 12 on the Billboard 200, with 23,000 album-equivalent units, marking the fifth highest debut of the week. It was the seventh best-selling album of the week, selling 21,000 copies in its first week. And the Anonymous Nobody... was the first De La Soul album to debut at number one on the Billboard Top Rap Albums. The album was also streamed 2 million times in the first week. It was nominated at the 59th Grammy Awards for Best Rap Album.

Track listing

 Notes
On the Kickstarter Exclusive edition of the album "You Go Dave (A Goldblatt Presentation)" contains the hidden track "Unfold" after it.
  signifies a co-producer

Charts

Weekly charts

Year-end charts

References

2016 albums
De La Soul albums
Rough Trade Records albums
Albums produced by Pete Rock
Kickstarter-funded albums
Albums recorded at Electro-Vox Recording Studios
Albums recorded at Westlake Recording Studios